George Lopez Why You Crying? is a 2004 stand-up comedy film starring George Lopez. It was recorded February 21, 2004, at the Terrace Theatre in Long Beach, California

References

2004 films
Stand-up comedy concert films
2004 comedy films